Marc Edward Wilmore (May 4, 1963 – January 30, 2021) was an American television writer, producer, actor, and comedian. He wrote and performed for shows such as In Living Color, The PJs, The Simpsons, and F Is for Family. Wilmore was a 10-time Primetime Emmy Award nominee. He was the younger brother of comedian Larry Wilmore.

Life and career
Marc Edward Wilmore was born on May 4, 1963, to parents Betty and Larry in Fontana, California. He had five siblings, one of whom, older brother Larry, is a television comic. He was a graduate of California State Polytechnic University, Pomona.

In the early 1990s, Wilmore got a job as a writer on the sketch comedy series In Living Color. He was promoted to cast member during the show's final season. Wilmore's impersonations included Isabel Sanford, Nell Carter, Carroll O'Connor, Robert Guillaume, Maya Angelou and James Earl Jones, and various sketches which re-imagined various television series such as All in the Family and The Mary Tyler Moore Show if they starred African-Americans. He received a nomination for the Primetime Emmy Award for Outstanding Writing for a Variety Series for his work on the show. After In Living Color, Wilmore wrote for The Tonight Show Starring Jay Leno and The PJs, a stop-motion adult sitcom co-created by his older brother Larry, where he also provided the voice of crooked police officer Walter Burkett.

While working on The PJs, Wilmore participated in a prank organized by staff members of The Simpsons, where he pretended he was the mayor of East St. Louis, Illinois and angrily accosted writer Matt Selman over a joke that denigrated the city in the episode "They Saved Lisa's Brain". As compensation for his involvement with the joke, Wilmore was given a role in the season 11 episode "It's a Mad, Mad, Mad, Mad Marge", in which he played a psychologist. Wilmore joined The Simpsonss writing staff in the show's thirteenth season, and received his first credit for the segment "Send in the Clones" in "Treehouse of Horror XIII". He won a Primetime Emmy Award for Outstanding Animated Program as a producer for the episode "Eternal Moonshine of the Simpson Mind" at the 60th Primetime Emmy Awards in 2008. In the 2010s, Wilmore worked as a writer and executive producer on F Is for Family, an animated sitcom co-created by Michael Price, who had worked with him on The PJs and The Simpsons. Wilmore also provided several voices in the series.

Death
Wilmore died at a hospital in Pomona, California, on January 30, 2021, at the age of 57.  According to his brother, Larry, he died "while battling COVID and other conditions that have had him in pain for many years" amid the COVID-19 pandemic in the United States. In The New York Times, Larry Wilmore related that his younger brother had long suffered health issues relating to a kidney transplant he had undergone in the 1990s. 

The penultimate episode of F Is for Family, "A Very Merry F***ing Christmas", is dedicated to him, as well as The Simpsons  episode "Wad Goals."

Credits

References

External links
 

1963 births
2021 deaths
African-American screenwriters
American television writers
American male television writers
African-American male actors
American impressionists (entertainers)
African-American male comedians
American male comedians
People from Fontana, California
Emmy Award winners
21st-century American male actors
American male voice actors
American male television actors
21st-century American comedians
21st-century American screenwriters
Deaths from the COVID-19 pandemic in California
21st-century American male writers
21st-century African-American people